Leopold Steinbatz (25 October 1918 – 23 June 1942) was a German Luftwaffe fighter ace during World War II and the only non-officer recipient of the Knight's Cross of the Iron Cross with Oak Leaves and Swords during World War II. He was "ace-in-a-day" twice, shooting down five aircraft on a single day.

Early life and career
Steinbatz was born on 25 October 1918 in Stammersdorf, present-day in Floridsdorf, one of the district of Vienna, in Austria-Hungary. In his youth, he learned to fly glider aircraft and received a vocational education as a butcher. Following his vocational education, he joined the Austrian Air Force and received pilot training with Flieger-Ausbildungsregiment (Flight Training Regiment) in Wiener Neustadt on 1 October 1937. Following the Anschluss in March 1938, the forced incorporation of Austria into Nazi Germany, was transferred to the Luftwaffe and was trained as a fighter pilot at the Jagdfliegerschule in Wien-Aspern.

World War II
World War II in Europe had begun on Friday, 1 September 1939, when German forces invaded Poland. Steinbatz was transferred to 2. Staffel (6th squadron) of the Ergänzungsgruppe of Jagdgeschwader 52 (JG 52—52nd Fighter Wing), a supplementary and training fighter group of JG 52. There he first met Hermann Graf, his future wingman on the Eastern Front. In August 1940, Steinbatz was transferred to 9. Staffel (9th squadron) of JG 52, a squadron of III. Gruppe (3rd Group) and was then assigned to the Luftwaffenmission Rumänien (Luftwaffe Mission Romania) under the command of Generalleutnant Wilhelm Speidel. The military mission from Germany supported General Ion Antonescu in the reorganization of his country's armed forces. III./JG 52 was transferred to Bucharest in mid-October and temporarily renamed I./Jagdgeschwader 28 (I./JG 28) until 4 January 1941.

During the Invasion of Yugoslavia of April 1941, III./JG 52 was kept back in reserve to guard the Ploiești oil installations. On 15 May, III./JG 52 was moved to Athens and together with other Luftwaffe units, flews its first combat missions in support of the Battle of Crete. During this campaign, Steinbatz flew multiple ground support missions against Greek forces and other Allied forces.

Eastern Front

In mid-June III./JG 52 returned to Bucharest to re-equip onto the Bf 109F just in time for Operation Barbarossa, the invasion of Russia. But again, tasked with protecting the oilfields, and being the southernmost Gruppen on the front, it had very little to do except to intercept bombers raiding the Romanian ports. So it was only once the Gruppen transferred to the Ukraine that Graf and Steinbatz were able to open their accounts - both shooting down I-16 fighters on the 4 August while escorting a Ju 87 formation.

For the rest of the year he often flew as Graf's wingman, flying as a potent combination. As the battle for Kharkov started at the end of September he was scoring consistently, and by the beginning of December he had 25 victories. On the 8 December he was awarded the Honour Goblet of the Luftwaffe. As one of the few fighter units not committed to the Battle of Moscow (Operation Taifun), III./JG 52 was shuttling alternately between the attack in the Ukraine, the Crimea and Rostov. At this time the Soviets retook Rostov and forced the unit back to the relative safety of Kharkov for the winter. After a dismal start to the eastern campaign, III./JG 52 ended as the most successful unit on the southern front.

Through the winter they would often fly patrols and not encounter any enemy aircraft. But with their unit not being rotated back for extended rest and refit over winter, Graf and Steinbatz kept up their success into the new year. Of one such encounter, on 8 January, he wrote to his wife:
Today was my lucky day. Early this morning we took off on a free-hunt mission and we actually spotted three Soviets... I flew together with a young comrade who had never been in combat before as the three 'brothers' appeared. Of course I immediately attacked one of the fighters. With a short burst of fire I blew off his left wing and he went down vertically.

Pulling up, I saw the second fighter below. He was watching his descending comrade. I dived again and attacked him. I hit his radiator and he made a forced landing. We shot the aircraft on fire.

Now the turn had come for the third aircraft, the bomber. My wingman had been attacking him but wasn't able to bring him down. As I approached him, he fired like mad. I came in very close, and then I shot him in flames with a few rounds. Burning, he crashed into a village.

Hermann Graf was awarded the Knight's Cross of the Iron Cross on 24 January 1942 for 42 victories and Steinbatz received the German Cross in Gold the day after. On 14 February, he too was awarded the Knight's Cross for also reaching 42 victories, and sent on extended leave. Graf was promoted to Staffelkapitän of 9./JG 52 in March, and by the beginning of April, his unit had racked up over 200 victories in Russia, for the loss of only 8 pilots of their own. When the unit transferred to the Crimea at the end of April, the pair took off on an unprecedented victory spree. The opening of the next Axis offensive was against the fortress of Sevastopol and the Kerch peninsula with very rugged defence. In two weeks, Graf's squadron shot down 93 aircraft, without any loss. Steinbatz claimed 7 victories on 8 May to take his own score to 58.

But a large Soviet counter-attack in May, south of Kharkov, forced III./JG 52 to be urgently dispatched to that sector. The Gruppe claimed 89 victories in just its first two days over Kharkov, with Graf becoming the first pilot in JG 52 to reach the century (on 14 May). Ofw Steinbatz got his 75th on 20 May, and although the ground offensive was blunted by the next day, the intense aerial combat continued. He claimed four victories apiece on 1 and 2 June and was awarded the Knight's Cross of the Iron Cross with Oak Leaves on 2 June for the 83 victories to date - being the first NCO in the Luftwaffe to receive this honour.

However the strain of ten months' almost non-stop combat was starting to show. In a letter to Frau Steinbatz, Graf wrote:
After his return he proved absolutely reckless... He entered upon an unparalleled victory march, scoring one victory after another! As he had achieved his No.80 and was expected to be awarded with the Oak Leaves. I urged him to take some leave. The combats had put a tremendous strain on his nerves. This was shown on several occasions. I grounded him for a couple of days, but then he requested that I allow him to start flying combat sorties again. As I was called to the Führer's Headquarters (on 24 May 1942), I exhorted him to 'cool down a bit'. But I knew that his goal was to reach his '100'.

By 11 June he had 95 victories, but on 15 June, he dived into a larger group of Soviet fighters. After claiming three quick victories (to take his score to 99) and eager to be the first NCO to top the century mark, he pursued them into a heavily defended AA zone. His Bf 109F4 "Yellow 2" was hit by Soviet AA fire and plummeted into the forests near Volzhansk, killing Steinbatz, although his body was never found. Eight days later, on 23 June, Leopold "Bazi" Steinbatz was awarded the Schwerter (Swords to the Knight's Cross) - this time becoming the only NCO in the entire Wehrmacht to be awarded this honour. He was also promoted to Leutnant. His 99 victories on the Eastern Front had been scored in only about 300 combat missions, and at the time, he was the 11th-ranking ace in the Luftwaffe.

His friend, Hermann Graf would survive the war, becoming the second man to reach 150 victories (on 4 September). Then, after a phenomenal scoring spree over Stalingrad, on 2 October he became the first pilot to ever score 200 victories. He ended the war with the rank of Oberstleutnant  (Lt Colonel) and commander of Jagdgeschwader 52.

Summary of career

Aerial victory claims
Mathews and Foreman, authors of Luftwaffe Aces — Biographies and Victory Claims, researched the German Federal Archives and found records for 98 aerial victory claims, plus one further unconfirmed claim, all of which claimed on the Eastern Front.

Awards
 Combined Pilots-Observation Badge
 Iron Cross (1939)
 2nd Class (1941)
 1st Class (1941)
 Front Flying Clasp of the Luftwaffe in Gold with Pennant "300"
 Honour Goblet of the Luftwaffe on 19 January 1942 as Unteroffizier and pilot
 German Cross in Gold on 22 January 1942 as Feldwebel in the 9./Jagdgeschwader 52
 Knight's Cross of the Iron Cross with Oak Leaves and Swords
 Knight's Cross on 14 February 1942 as Feldwebel and pilot in the 9./Jagdgeschwader 52
 96th Oak Leaves on 2 June 1942 as Oberfeldwebel and pilot in the 9./Jagdgeschwader 52
 14th Swords on 23 June 1942 (posthumous) as Oberfeldwebel and pilot in the 9./Jagdgeschwader 52

Notes

References

Citations

Bibliography

 
 
 
 
 
 
 
 
 
 
 
 
 
 
 Spick, Mike (2006). 	Aces of the Reich. 	Greenhill Books. 	
 
 
 
 
 
 Weal, John (2007). 	More Bf109 Aces of the Russian Front. 	Oxford: Osprey Publishing Ltd. 	.
 

1918 births
1942 deaths
Military personnel from Vienna
German World War II flying aces
Luftwaffe personnel killed in World War II
Recipients of the Gold German Cross
Recipients of the Knight's Cross of the Iron Cross with Oak Leaves and Swords
Aviators killed by being shot down